Agdistis zhengi is a moth in the family Pterophoridae. It is known from China.

References

Agdistinae
Moths described in 2007